MacArthur or Macarthur is a surname, originating with the Scottish Clan MacArthur and now spread through English-speaking countries. Notable people with the surname include:

Business
 Catherine T. MacArthur (1909–1981), American businesswoman, philanthropist, wife of John D. MacArthur
 Elizabeth Macarthur (1766–1850), Australian businesswoman, wife of John Macarthur (wool pioneer)
 Hannibal Hawkins Macarthur (1788–1861), Australian businessman and politician
 J. Roderick MacArthur (1920–1984), American businessman and philanthropist
 John Macarthur (wool pioneer) (1767–1834), Australian businessman, politician, and soldier
 John D. MacArthur (1897–1978), American businessman and philanthropist

Entertainment
 Charles MacArthur (1895–1956), American playwright and screenwriter
 James MacArthur (1937–2010), American actor

Literature
 John F. MacArthur (b. 1939), American evangelical minister and author
 John R. MacArthur (b. 1956), American journalist

Military
 Arthur MacArthur, Jr. (1845–1912), American military leader and father of Douglas MacArthur
 Arthur MacArthur III (1876–1923), American naval officer and brother of Douglas MacArthur
 Douglas MacArthur (1880–1964), American military leader and U.S. Army General of the Army
 Edward Macarthur (1789–1872), Anglo-Australian general and administrator
 George MacArthur-Onslow (1875–1931), Australian general
 James Macarthur-Onslow (1867–1946), Australian general, politician and company director

Politics
 Arthur MacArthur, Sr. (1815–1896), American lawyer, judge, and politician
 Douglas MacArthur II (1909–1997), American diplomat

Sports
 Clarke MacArthur born 1985), Canadian hockey player
 Ellen MacArthur (born 1976), British yachtswoman
 Mac MacArthur (1862–1932), Scottish baseball player

Science
 John Stewart MacArthur (died 1920), chemist from Glasgow
 Robert MacArthur (1930–1972), American ecologist
 William Macarthur (1800–1882), Australian botanist and vigneron

Other people
 Jean MacArthur (1898–2000), second wife of Douglas MacArthur

Fictional Characters
 MacArthur, a character from The Ridonculous Race

See also
 Arthur (surname)
 McArthur (surname)

Scottish surnames